Cisthene orbonella is a moth of the family Erebidae. It was described by George Hampson in 1900. It is found in the Brazilian states of Paraná and Rio de Janeiro.

References

Cisthenina
Moths described in 1900